The 210th Pennsylvania Volunteer Infantry was an infantry regiment that served in the Union Army during the American Civil War.

Service
The 210th Pennsylvania Infantry was organized at Harrisburg, Pennsylvania beginning September 12, 1864 and mustered on September 28, 1864, under the command of Colonel William Sergeant.

The regiment was attached to 3rd Brigade, 2nd Division, V Corps, Army of the Potomac.

The 210th Pennsylvania Infantry mustered out of service on May 30, 1865.

Detailed service
Siege of Petersburg, Va., October 1864 to April 1865. Boydton Plank Road, Hatcher's Run October 27–28, 1864. Warren's Raid on Weldon Railroad December 7–12. Dabney's Mills, Hatcher's Run, February 5–7, 1865. Appomattox Campaign March 28-April 9. Lewis's Farm near Gravelly Run March 29. White Oak Road March 30–31. Five Forks April 1. Appomattox Court House April 9. Surrender of Lee and his army. Marched to Washington, D.C., May 1–12. Grand Review of the Armies May 23.

Casualties
The regiment lost a total of 85 men during service; 3 officers and 37 enlisted men killed or mortally wounded, 1 officer and 44 enlisted men died of disease.

Commanders
 Colonel William Sergeant - mortally wounded in action at the Battle of White Oak Road; died April 11, 1865
 Lieutenant Colonel Edward L. Witman - led the regiment after White Oak Road, commissioned Colonel April 12, 1865, but never mustered at rank

Medals of Honor
 Private Charles Day, Company K - Medal of Honor recipient for action at the Battle of Hatcher's Run
 Assistant Surgeon Jacob F. Raub of the 210th - Medal of Honor recipient for action at the Battle of Hatcher's Run

See also

 List of Pennsylvania Civil War Units
 Pennsylvania in the Civil War

References
 Dyer, Frederick H. A Compendium of the War of the Rebellion (Des Moines, IA: Dyer Pub. Co.), 1908.
 Hughes, Thomas L. A Brief History 210th Pennsylvania Volunteer Infantry Regiment War of Rebellion, 1864-1865 (S.l.: Agb WorldCom Publications), 2006.
Attribution
 

Military units and formations established in 1864
Military units and formations disestablished in 1865
Units and formations of the Union Army from Pennsylvania